Fusang refers to various entities, most frequently a mythical tree or location east of China, described in ancient Chinese literature.

In the Classic of Mountains and Seas and several contemporary texts, the term refers to a mythological tree of life, alternatively identified as a mulberry or a hibiscus, allegedly growing far to the east of China, and perhaps to various more concrete territories which are located to the east of the mainland.

A country which was named Fusang was described by the native Buddhist missionary Hui Shen (also called Hwui Shan) in 499 AD, as a place which is located 20,000 Chinese li to the east of Da-han, and it is also located to the east of China (according to Joseph Needham, Da-han corresponds to the Buriat region of Siberia). Hui Shen arrived in China from Kabul in 450 AD and went by ship to Fusang in 458 AD, and upon his return in 499 reported his findings to the Chinese Emperor. His descriptions are recorded in the 7th-century text Book of Liang by Yao Silian, and they describe a  civilization which inhabits the Fusang country. The Fusang which is described by Shen has variously been posited to be the Americas, Sakhalin Island, the Kamchatka Peninsula or the Kuril Islands. The American hypothesis was the most hotly debated one during the late 19th and early 20th centuries, after the 18th-century writings of Joseph de Guignes were republished and disseminated by Charles Godfrey Leland in 1875. Sinologists, including Emil Bretschneider, Berthold Laufer, and Henri Cordier, refuted this hypothesis, however, and according to Needham, the American hypothesis was all but refuted by the time of the First World War.

In later Chinese accounts, other, even less well-identified places were given the name Fusang.

Mythological accounts 
An earlier account claims that in 219 BC, emperor Shi Huang sent an expedition of some 3,000 convicts to a place which was located far off to the east, across the ocean, a place which was called Fusang, where they were required to make a sacrifice to a volcano god who held the elixir of life. Apparently, two expeditions were undertaken by Xu Fu, the court sorcerer, in order to seek the elixir of life. The first expedition returned c. 210 BC because Xu Fu claimed that a giant sea creature was blocking his men's path. Archers were then sent to kill this monster when the expedition set out a second time, but it was never heard from again. However, "... asides in the Record of the Historian imply that its leader Xu Fu had returned to China long ago and was lurking somewhere near Langya, frittering away the expedition's impressive budget."

Interpretations of the Shen account

Eastern Japan
Japan was one place which was named Fusang. However, Hui Shen's report differentiates Fusang from the ancient Japanese kingdom of Wo, which has been tentatively located in the Kinki, Kyūshū, or it has been located on the Ryukyu Islands.

In Chinese mythology, Fusang refers to a divine tree and an island which are both located in the East, from where the sun rises. A similar tree, known as the Ruomu exists in the west, and each morning, the sun was said to rise in Fusang and fall on Ruomu. According to Chinese legends, ten birds (typically ravens) lived in the tree, and because nine of the birds rested, the tenth bird would carry the sun on its journey. This legend has similarities with the Chinese tale of the fictional hero Houyi, sometimes referred to as the Archer, who is credited with saving the world by shooting down nine of the suns when all ten suns simultaneously took to the air one day. Some scholars have identified the bronze trees which were found at the archaeological site Sanxingdui as these Fusang trees.

The term Fusang would later be used as a designation for 'Japan' in Chinese poetry. Since Japanese name Nihon (lit. 'Root [i.e. source, birthplace, origin] of the Sun') or the Chinese name Riben was a name of Japan, some Tang dynasty poets believed that Fusang "lay between the mainland and Japan." For instance, Wang Wei wrote a 753 farewell poem when Abe no Nakamaro (Chinese Zhao Heng ) returned to Japan, "The trees of your home are beyond Fu-sang."

Fusang is pronounced Fusō in Japanese, from classical Fusau, and it is one of the names which is used as a designation for ancient Japan. Several warships of the Imperial Japanese Navy were named Fusō (the Japanese ironclad warship Fusō, or the World War II battleship Fusō). Several companies, such as Fuso, also bear the name.

Gustaaf Schlegel believed that Fusang was most probably "the long island of Karafuto or it was Sakhalin". Joseph Needham added that "if Kamchatka and the Kuriles may also be considered, there is no better means of identifying it at the present day."

Note that there was an ancient province of Japan which was named the Fusa-no kuni (the 'Country of Fusa') in eastern Honshū, which encompassed all of the modern-day Chiba Prefecture as well as the southwestern part of the modern-day Ibaraki Prefecture.

The Americas

According to some historians such as Charles Godfrey Leland and Joseph de Guignes (Le Fou-Sang des Chinois est-il l'Amérique? Mémoires de l'Académie des Inscriptions et Belles Lettres, tome 28, Paris, 1761), the distances which are given by Hui Shen (20,000 Chinese li) would mean that Fusang is located on the west coast of the American continent, when the ancient Han-period definition of the Chinese li is taken into account. Some 18th-century European maps locate Fusang north of California, in the area of British Columbia. An American location does not match with the claim that horses were sighted (because horses did not exist in either North or South America at that time) nor does it match with the claim that deer were domesticated and milked.

Fusang was mentioned in a map of Marco Polo's voyages to the Far East which was supposedly made (or copied) by his family, the map includes the Kamchatka Peninsula and Alaska. The map has been dated to the 15th or 16th century, which means that at best, it is a copy of the original map. However, the ink wasn't dated, so it's also possible that Alaska could've been added later on when the existence of it became known.

Descriptions of Fusang

According to the report of Hui Shen to the Chinese during his visit to China, which is described in the Book of Liang:

On the organization of the country:

On the social practices:

The Book of Liang also describes the conversion of Fusang to the Buddhist faith by five Buddhist monks who were from Gandhara:

It is also reported that 1,000 li (415 km, 258 miles) beyond of Fusang, there was a Land of Women, where "its female inhabitants were completely covered with hair, walked erect, and chattered a lot among themselves but were shy when they saw ordinary human beings. They gave birth to their young after six or seven months of pregnancy and nursed them on their backs. The babies were able to walk within 100 days and were fully grown in three or four years."

See also
Xu Fu
Chinese mythology
Zhou Man
Pre-Columbian transoceanic contact theories

References

Leyland, Charles Godfrey (1875) Fusang; Or, The Discovery of America by Chinese Buddhist Priests in the Fifth Century, New York: Barnes & Noble, 1973. Reprint: Forgotten Books (2010), .
Vining, Edward P. (1885) Inglorious Columbus; or, Evidence that Hwui Shan and a Party of Buddhist Monks from Afghanistan Discovered America in the Fifth Century, A.D.. New York: D. Appleton and Company, 
 Williams, S. Wells (1881): Notices of Fu-sang, and Other Countries Lying East of China, in the Pacific Ocean. Translated from the Antiquarian Researches of Ma Twan-Lin, with Notes. Tuttle, Morehouse & Taylor, New Haven. Downloaded from https://archive.org/details/noticesoffusanga00willrich on 5 June 2011.

External links
www.uh.edu/
Description of Fusang in ancient Chinese literature 《梁書•五十四•列傳四十八》 
Article at CRIENGLISH.com on Xu Fu's expedition to Japan
 
  Also full view at Google Books.
 A full translation in French of the account in the Book of Liang was given by Schlegel (1892) 

Kofun period
Yayoi period
Former countries in Chinese history
Former countries in Japanese history
Pre-Columbian trans-oceanic contact
Locations in Chinese mythology
Trees in mythology
Mythological places
Names of Japan
Asia in mythology
Historical Chinese exonyms